Hassan Allam Holding is Egypt's leading engineering, construction and infrastructure company, founded in 1936.

Operation
Hassan Allam Holding operates in diverse sectors with a focus on large-scale engineering and construction projects, building materials, electrical and utility investment and development.

The company has more than 35,000 employees in Egypt and the MENA Region.

See also
List of companies of Egypt

References

External links 
 

1975 establishments in Egypt
Construction and civil engineering companies of Egypt
Construction and civil engineering companies established in 1975
Conglomerate companies of Egypt